Highdown may refer to:

 Highdown Gardens, a garden in Worthing, England
 Highdown Hill, a prominent hill in the South Downs, England
 Highdown New Mill, Angmering, a tower mill in Sussex, England
 Highdown School, an academy in Reading, Berkshire

See also
 High Down (disambiguation)